Kalyagin is a Russian masculine surname, its feminine counterpart is Kalyagina. Notable people with the surname include:

Alexander Kalyagin (born 1942), Russian actor and film director
Vasiliy Kalyagin, Soviet sprint canoer 

Russian-language surnames